Myrtle Avenue is a street in the London Borough of Hounslow which is near the eastern end of Heathrow airport's south runway, 27L. This makes it especially noisy when aircraft are landing or taking off from 27L, though its view of the aircraft has made it the prime location for plane spotting.

Every day, dozens of spotters from all over the world go there to log and photograph the aircraft. At the end of the road is a large green space which is directly underneath the flight paths to and from Runway 27. The nearest London Underground station to Myrtle Avenue is Hatton Cross on the Piccadilly Line.  On special occasions, such as the arrival of a new type of aircraft, there may be hundreds of spectators there, including the general public as well as regular spotters.

See also
 Big Jet TV

References

Heathrow Airport
Streets in the London Borough of Hounslow
Tourist attractions in the London Borough of Hounslow